Giovanni (Ivan) Biagio Luppis Freiherr von Rammer (27 August 1813 – 11 January 1875), sometimes also known by the Croatian name of Vukić, was an officer of the Austro-Hungarian Navy who headed a commission to develop the first prototypes of the self-propelled torpedo.

Early years

Giovanni Luppis (or Ivan Lupis) was born in the city of Rijeka (then Fiume) in 1813, which was at the time part of the Illyrian Provinces, but soon passed back to Austria. His parents were Ferdinando Carlo, nobleman of Poreč and Vis, and Giovanna Parich (Parić, Perić), noble of Republic of Dubrovnik. Because of his mixed Italian-Croatian ancestry, his family was at different times also known as Vukić, a Croatianized variant of the name Lupis (both meaning "wolf"), and he himself is occasionally referred to as Ivan Vukić, especially by Croatians.

In the city of Fiume, Giovanni Luppis's family has been powerful shipowners. Luppis attended a gymnasium in Fiume and the Collegio di marina, the Austrian naval academy in Venice. Then he married a noblewoman, the Baroness Elisa de Zotti.

He served in the Venezianisch-Österreichische Kriegsmarine (after 1849 K.u.K Kriegsmarine ) and rose up the ranks to the position of Frigate Captain (Fregattenkapitan). In 1848/1849 he was an officer on the ships that blockaded Venice.

The "Salvacoste" (Coastsaver)

About the middle in the 18th century, an officer of the Austrian Marine Artillery conceived the idea of employing a small boat carrying a large charge of explosives, powered by a steam or an air engine and remotely steered by cable to be used against enemy ships. Upon his death, before he had perfected his invention or made it public, the papers of this anonymous officer came into the possession of Capt. Giovanni Luppis.

 He envisioned a floating device for destroying ships that would be unmanned and controlled from land, while the explosive charges would detonate at the moment of impact. His first prototype was one metre long, had glass wings, and was controlled via long ropes from the coast. It didn't succeed due to it being too cumbersome.

The second model was built with a clock mechanism as the engine for the propeller. The explosives were in the stern and were ignited through a pistol-like control, which in turn was activated through the bow, the sides or the mast. It had two rudders: one turned to the right, the other to the left, that were moved by ropes/wires from land. After numerous experiments, this design, marked '6 m', finally performed but not well enough. He nicknamed it 'Salvacoste', Italian for "Coastsaver".

In 1860, after Luppis had retired from the Navy, he managed to demonstrate the '6 m' design to the Emperor Franz Joseph, but the naval commission refused to accept it without better propulsion and control systems.

The meeting with Robert Whitehead

In Fiume in 1864, the future mayor Giovanni de Ciotta introduced Luppis to the British machine engineer Robert Whitehead, manager of the local factory "Stabilimento Tecnico Fiumano", with whom he signed a contract to develop the 'salvacoste' further.

After looking at Luppis's previous efforts Whitehead built a model but decided that the idea was not viable. Whitehead then significantly altered the previous designs and started to think about the problem of setting off explosive charges remotely below a ship's waterline, this being far more effective than above-water bombardment. Whitehead then made a device running under water and installed an engine running on compressed air, as well as automatic guidances for the depth and direction.

On 21 December 1866 the first automobile torpedo, now named Minenschiff, was officially demonstrated in front of the Austro-Hungarian State Naval Commission for evaluation. This model was 355 mm in diameter and 3.35 m in length, weighing 136 kg with 8 kg of explosives. The naval commission accepted it, and subsequently on 6 March 1867 the government contracted the inventors for a test production and agreed to pay all the production costs.

Whitehead retained the copyrights and even negotiated a new contract with Luppis. This however gave Whitehead full control of all future sales.

On 27 May 1867, the navy paid 200,000 forints in royalties to the inventor (Fiume being located in the Hungarian part of the Empire). The invention was generally regarded as a promising one, but in the first years of production there were not enough orders, so "Stabilimento" went through a crisis and went bankrupt in 1873. Whitehead then took it over and at the beginning of 1875 transformed it into a private company called 'Torpedo-Fabrik von Robert Whitehead'.

Giovanni Luppis was given the noble title of Baron von Rammer ('the sinker') by Kaiser Franz Josef on 1 August 1869. He died in the borough (frazione) of Torriggia, in the municipality of Laglio, near Como on 11 January 1875.

Further reading

 Gray, Edwin. The Devil's Device: Robert Whitehead and the History of the Torpedo, Annapolis: Naval Institute Press, 1991 310pp, 
 Wilson, H. W. Ironclads in action;: A sketch of naval warfare from 1855 to 1895, London:  Sampson Low, Marston and Company, 1895, Fourth Edition 1896 (Two Volumes), pre ISBN

See also

 Croats of Italy

References

External links
Giovanni Luppis genealogy
Giovanni Luppis in the Libro d'Oro della Nobiltà Italiana
History of Rijeka torpedo factory
History of the Whithead Factory (part one)
Evolution of the submarine weapons in 19th century (in Italian)
History of R. Whitehead (site about Royal Navy)
History of the torpedo: the early days (Journal of the Royal Navy Scientific Service Vol 27 No 1)
Torpedo History (Naval Undersea Museum of U.S. Navy)
La Voce del Popolo (Fiume), Sabato 3 marzo 2007: Storia del silurificio di Fiume e biografia di Giovanni Luppis  (pp. 6–7)

1813 births
1875 deaths
Austrian monarchists
Austrian nobility
19th-century Italian inventors
Austro-Hungarian Navy officers
Barons of Austria
Weapon designers
People from Rijeka
Economy of Rijeka